September Morn is a controversial oil painting by the French artist Paul Émile Chabas. The term may also refer to:

September Morn (album), a 1979 album by Neil Diamond
"September Morn", the title song of said album
September Morn (film), a 1914 film by Pathé inspired by the painting